Petar Spasić (born 18 January 1992) is a Serbian football player who plays for  Villanueva CF

References

External links
 
 Petar Spasić stats at utakmica.rs 
 

1992 births
Living people
People from Smederevska Palanka
Association football defenders
Serbian footballers
FK Čukarički players
OFK Mladenovac players
FK Kolubara players
FK BSK Borča players
Serbian First League players
Serbian SuperLiga players